Bridge of Don Academy is an Aberdeen City Council operated six-year secondary comprehensive school and community centre in Bridge of Don, Aberdeen, Scotland.
The building was opened in 1979, originally designed to accommodate around 900 pupils. The school's functional capacity is currently 799. Its feeder primaries are Balmedie, Braehead and Scotstown primary schools.

The school campus is currently shared with Braehead Primary School and Saint Columbia's Church of Scotland and Roman Catholic church. Adjacent to the school is Westfield Park and playing fields.

Houses
The school uses a house system and is split into four named after local castles. In 2012 pupils of the school were asked to come up with names that they thought were ideal to fit the new houses. These are: 
Braemar House
Crathes House
Drum House 
Fyvie House
Prior to this the school had four houses named after Scottish islands: 
Arran House 
Iona House 
Skye House 
Tiree House

References

External links
School Website
Bridge of Don Academy's page on Parentzone

Secondary schools in Aberdeen
1979 establishments in Scotland
Educational institutions established in 1979